Pickles Creek is a stream in the U.S. state of South Dakota. It is a tributary of Rabbit Creek.

Pickles Creek has the name of Frank "Pickles" Koshirak, a local rancher.

See also
List of rivers of South Dakota

References

Rivers of Perkins County, South Dakota
Rivers of South Dakota